= Spiagge.it =

Italian technology company, founded 2013

- Type: Private
- Industry: Software
- Founded: 2013
- Founder: Niccolò Para, Andrea Menghi
- Headquarters: Rimini, Italy
- Key people: Gabriele Greco (CEO)
- Products: Reservation platforms; management software
- Website: spiagge.it

Spiagge.it is an Italian technology company that develops digital platforms and software for the leisure and hospitality sector. Based in Rimini, it operates a consumer booking services and management software for beach-establishment operators.

== History ==
The company was founded as YourBeach in Rimini in 2013 by Niccolò Para and Andrea Menghi, which developed management software for beach establishments. In December 2020, the founders were joined by investors including Diego Palano and Matteo Tiddia, and the service was renamed from YourBeach to Spiagge.it in 2021.

In 2023, the company raised €1.4 million in funding round led by Growth Engine. In 2024, it raised a further €1 million from the Fondo Rilancio Startup, managed by CDP Venture Capital SGR, which supported its entry into the French market.

In 2025, Spiagge.it launched a platform for swimming pools and water parks.

== Overview ==
Spiagge.it operates online reservation platforms for beach establishments, swimming pools, and water parks, alongside management software for venue operators. Its software supports reservation management, payments, and availability, and its consumer platforms enable online bookings. In March 2022, Spiagge.it, with the insurance company Revo and the broker GBSapri, introduced a parametric weather-insurance product that reimburses umbrella rentals when rainfall exceeds a set threshold. The company has 3,000 participating establishments in 2026. Gabriele Greco is the chief executive officer.
